Nicole Marie Jeanne Andrieu (21 October 1931 – 25 June 2016), better known as Nicole Courcel, was a French actress who achieved popularity through the 1950s and 1960s, though she is mostly unknown outside of France. Born in Saint-Cloud, in the western suburbs of Paris, she appeared in more than 40 films between 1947 and 1979.  After working as an extra in a few films, she won a major role in Rendez-vous de juillet (1949), with Brigitte Auber.  In 1970 she turned to television, appearing in different television films and miniseries, in which she continued to work until 2004.  Courcel is best known for her role in Serge Bourguignon's Sundays and Cybele (1962).  She had notable parts in: La Marie du port (1950, opposite Jean Gabin), Sacha Guitry's Royal Affairs in Versailles (1954), and La Sorcière (1956, opposite Marina Vlady).

Partial filmography

Antoine and Antoinette (1947) - (uncredited)
Les amoureux sont seuls au monde (1948) - (uncredited)
 To the Eyes of Memory (1948) - Une élève du cours Simon (uncredited)
Rendezvous in July (1949) - Christine Courcel
La Marie du port (1950) - Marie Le Flem
Les amants de Bras-Mort (1951) - Monique Levers
Gibier de potence (1951) - Dominique
Les amours finissent à l'aube (1953) - Léone Fassler
Royal Affairs in Versailles (1954) - Madame de Chalis
Le collège en folie (1954) - Lydia
 The Big Flag (1954)  - Madeleine
Marchandes d'illusions (1954) - Maria
Les clandestines (1954) - Véronique Gaudin
Papa, maman, la bonne et moi (1954) - Catherine Liseray
Huis clos (1954) - Olga
Papa, maman, ma femme et moi (1955) - Catherine Langlois
La Sorcière (1956) - Kristina Lundgren
Women's Club (1956) - Nicole Leroy
 The Case of Doctor Laurent (1957) - Francine
L'inspecteur aime la bagarre (1957) - Hélène Davault
La peau de l'ours (1957) - Anne-Marie Ledrut
La belle et le tzigane (1958) - Georgina Welles
The Man Who Walked Through the Wall (1959) - Yvonne Steiner - eine Französin
Testament of Orpheus (1960) - La mère maladroite / The Young Mother (uncredited)
Tomorrow Is My Turn (1960) - Florence
Les amours de Paris (1961) - Nicole Lasnier
Amazons of Rome (1961) - Lucilla - Porcenna's Wife
Vive Henri IV... vive l'amour! (1961) - Jacqueline de Bueil
Les petits drames (1961) - Yvonne
Konga Yo (1962) - Marie
Sundays and Cybele (1962) - Madeleine
Delay in Marienborn (1963) - Nurse Kathy
Nick Carter and Red Club (1965) - Dora Beckmann
Les ruses du diable (Neuf portraits d'une jeune fille) (1966) - La patronne de la guinguette
Les Créatures (1966) - (uncredited)
The Night of the Generals (1967) - Raymonde
L'étrangleur (1970) - Claire, la prostituée
L'aventure c'est l'aventure (1972) - Nicole
Le Rempart des béguines (1972) - Tamara
Un officier de police sans importance (1973) - Fabienne
The Slap (1974) - Madeleine
Thomas (1975) - Florence, la mère
L'esprit de famille (1979) - Hélène Moreau

References

External links
 
 
 
 Nicole Courcel at Cinémathèque française 
 In Sherlock Holmes: "The Case of the Deadly Prophecy" at Internet Archive

1931 births
2016 deaths
People from Saint-Cloud
French film actresses
French television actresses
20th-century French actresses